Starwards Public School is an English medium ICSE & ISC Board affiliated School in Tulsipur, Balrampur district, Uttar Pradesh, India.

Establishment 
The school was founded by Vinod Singh Kalhans, in 1999. It was set up as Junior High School in Tulsipur, Balrampur District. Initially the school was recognized by Hindi Medium but now it is affiliated with English medium and known as the only English medium recognized school in the locality. Ms. Kalpana Singh was the first principal of the school.

Infrastructure
The school has a Learning Resource Center (library) and a Digital Resource Center, Science laboratories, Computer laboratory, Herbal Garden, Meteorological laboratory, and Science Park and Library.

References

Primary schools in Uttar Pradesh
Balrampur district, Uttar Pradesh
Educational institutions established in 1999
1999 establishments in Uttar Pradesh